Jacobean may refer to:

 Jacobean architecture
 Jacobean English (the language used in the King James Version of the Bible)
 Jacobean era
 Jacobean literature
 Jacobean theatre
 An adjectival form of the name James, particular in relation to the biblical Epistle of James

See also
 Jacobian (disambiguation)
 Jacobin (disambiguation)
 Jacobite (disambiguation)
 Jacobitism

th:จาโคไบท์